This article comprises three sortable tables of major mountain peaks of the Rocky Mountains of North America.

The summit of a mountain or hill may be measured in three principal ways:
The topographic elevation of a summit measures the height of the summit above a geodetic sea level.  The first table below ranks the 100 highest major summits of greater North America by elevation.
The topographic prominence of a summit is a measure of how high the summit rises above its surroundings.  The second table below ranks the 50 most prominent summits of greater North America.
The topographic isolation (or radius of dominance) of a summit measures how far the summit lies from its nearest point of equal elevation.  The third table below ranks the 50 most isolated major summits of greater North America.



Highest major summits

Of the 100 highest major summits of the Rocky Mountains, 62 peaks exceed  elevation, and all 100 peaks exceed  elevation.

Of these 100 peaks, 78 (including the 30 highest) are located in Colorado, ten in Wyoming, six in New Mexico, three in Montana, and one each in Utah, British Columbia, and Idaho.

Most prominent summits

Of the 50 most prominent summits of the Rocky Mountains, only Mount Robson and Mount Elbert exceed  of topographic prominence, seven peaks exceed , 31 peaks are ultra-prominent summits with at least , and all 50 peaks exceed  of topographic prominence.

Of these 50 peaks, 12 are located in British Columbia, 12 in Montana, ten in Alberta, eight in Colorado, four in Wyoming, three in Utah, three in Idaho, and one in New Mexico.  Three of these peaks lie on the Alberta-British Columbia border.

Most isolated major summits

Of the 50 most isolated major summits of the Rocky Mountains, only Mount Elbert exceeds  of topographic isolation, six peaks exceed , 19 peaks exceed , and all 50 peaks exceed  of topographic isolation.

Of these 50 peaks, 17 are located in Montana, ten in Colorado, nine in Wyoming, six in British Columbia, five in Utah, two in Alberta, two in New Mexico, and one in Idaho.  Two of these peaks lie on the Alberta-British Columbia border.

See also

Rocky Mountains

List of extreme summits of the Rocky Mountains
List of mountain peaks of North America
List of mountain peaks of Greenland
List of mountain peaks of Canada
List of mountain peaks of the United States
List of mountain peaks of Colorado
List of mountain peaks of Idaho
List of mountain peaks of Montana
List of mountain peaks of New Mexico
List of mountain peaks of Utah
List of mountain peaks of Wyoming
List of mountain peaks of México
List of mountain peaks of Central America
List of mountain peaks of the Caribbean
Physical geography
Topography
Topographic elevation
Topographic prominence
Topographic isolation

Notes

References

External links

Natural Resources Canada (NRC)
Canadian Geographical Names @ NRC
United States Geological Survey (USGS)
Geographic Names Information System @ USGS
United States National Geodetic Survey (NGS)
Geodetic Glossary @ NGS
NGVD 29 to NAVD 88 online elevation converter @ NGS
Survey Marks and Datasheets @ NGS
Bivouac.com
Peakbagger.com
Peaklist.org
Peakware.com
Summitpost.org

Mountains of North America
Lists of mountains of Canada
Lists of mountains of the United States
Lists of mountains by range
Lists of mountains by elevation
Lists of mountains by prominence
Lists of mountains by isolation